In computer science, binary search, also known as half-interval search, logarithmic search, or binary chop, is a search algorithm that finds the position of a target value within a sorted array. Binary search compares the target value to the middle element of the array. If they are not equal, the half in which the target cannot lie is eliminated and the search continues on the remaining half, again taking the middle element to compare to the target value, and repeating this until the target value is found. If the search ends with the remaining half being empty, the target is not in the array.

Binary search runs in logarithmic time in the worst case, making  comparisons, where  is the number of elements in the array. Binary search is faster than linear search except for small arrays. However, the array must be sorted first to be able to apply binary search. There are specialized data structures designed for fast searching, such as hash tables, that can be searched more efficiently than binary search. However, binary search can be used to solve a wider range of problems, such as finding the next-smallest or next-largest element in the array relative to the target even if it is absent from the array.

There are numerous variations of binary search. In particular, fractional cascading speeds up binary searches for the same value in multiple arrays. Fractional cascading efficiently solves a number of search problems in computational geometry and in numerous other fields. Exponential search extends binary search to unbounded lists. The binary search tree and B-tree data structures are based on binary search.

Algorithm 
Binary search works on sorted arrays. Binary search begins by comparing an element in the middle of the array with the target value. If the target value matches the element, its position in the array is returned. If the target value is less than the element, the search continues in the lower half of the array. If the target value is greater than the element, the search continues in the upper half of the array. By doing this, the algorithm eliminates the half in which the target value cannot lie in each iteration.

Procedure 
 If , the search terminates as unsuccessful.
 Now , the search is done; return .

The procedure may be expressed in pseudocode as follows, where the variable names and types remain the same as above, floor is the floor function, and unsuccessful refers to a specific value that conveys the failure of the search.

 function binary_search(A, n, T) is
     L := 0
     R := n − 1
     while L ≤ R do
         m := floor((L + R) / 2)
         if A[m] < T then
             L := m + 1
         else if A[m] > T then
             R := m − 1
         else:
             return m
     return unsuccessful

This may change the result if the target value appears more than once in the array.

Alternative procedure 
In the above procedure, the algorithm checks whether the middle element is equal to the target in every iteration. Some implementations leave out this check during each iteration. The algorithm would perform this check only when one element is left (when ). This results in a faster comparison loop, as one comparison is eliminated per iteration, while it requires only one more iteration on average.

Hermann Bottenbruch published the first implementation to leave out this check in 1962.

 While ,
 Now , the search is done. If , return . Otherwise, the search terminates as unsuccessful.

Where ceil is the ceiling function, the pseudocode for this version is:

 function binary_search_alternative(A, n, T) is
     L := 0
     R := n − 1
     while L != R do
         m := ceil((L + R) / 2)
         if A[m] > T then
             R := m − 1
         else:
             L := m
     if A[L] = T then
         return L
     return unsuccessful

Duplicate elements 
The procedure may return any index whose element is equal to the target value, even if there are duplicate elements in the array. The regular procedure would return the 4th element (index 3) in this case. It does not always return the first duplicate (consider  which still returns the 4th element). However, it is sometimes necessary to find the leftmost element or the rightmost element for a target value that is duplicated in the array. In the above example, the 4th element is the leftmost element of the value 4, while the 5th element is the rightmost element of the value 4. The alternative procedure above will always return the index of the rightmost element if such an element exists.

Procedure for finding the leftmost element 
To find the leftmost element, the following procedure can be used:

 While ,
 Return .

Where floor is the floor function, the pseudocode for this version is:

 function binary_search_leftmost(A, n, T):
     L := 0
     R := n - 1
     while L < R:
         m := floor((L + R) / 2)
         if A[m] < T:
             L := m + 1
         else:
             R := m
     return L

Procedure for finding the rightmost element 
To find the rightmost element, the following procedure can be used:

 While ,
 Return .

Where floor is the floor function, the pseudocode for this version is:

 function binary_search_rightmost(A, n, T):
     L := 0
     R := n
     while L < R:
         m := floor((L + R) / 2)
         if A[m] > T:
             R := m
         else:
             L := m + 1
     return R - 1

Approximate matches 

The above procedure only performs exact matches, finding the position of a target value. However, it is trivial to extend binary search to perform approximate matches because binary search operates on sorted arrays. For example, binary search can be used to compute, for a given value, its rank (the number of smaller elements), predecessor (next-smallest element), successor (next-largest element), and nearest neighbor. Range queries seeking the number of elements between two values can be performed with two rank queries.
 Rank queries can be performed with the procedure for finding the leftmost element. The number of elements less than the target value is returned by the procedure.
 Predecessor queries can be performed with rank queries.
 For successor queries, the procedure for finding the rightmost element can be used.
 The nearest neighbor of the target value is either its predecessor or successor, whichever is closer.
 Range queries are also straightforward. Once the ranks of the two values are known, the number of elements greater than or equal to the first value and less than the second is the difference of the two ranks. This count can be adjusted up or down by one according to whether the endpoints of the range should be considered to be part of the range and whether the array contains entries matching those endpoints.

Performance 

In terms of the number of comparisons, the performance of binary search can be analyzed by viewing the run of the procedure on a binary tree. The root node of the tree is the middle element of the array. The middle element of the lower half is the left child node of the root, and the middle element of the upper half is the right child node of the root. The rest of the tree is built in a similar fashion. Starting from the root node, the left or right subtrees are traversed depending on whether the target value is less or more than the node under consideration.

This is because the worst case is reached when the search reaches the deepest level of the tree, and there are always  levels in the tree for any binary search.

The worst case may also be reached when the target element is not in the array. If  is one less than a power of two, then this is always the case. Otherwise, the search may perform iterations if the search reaches the deepest level of the tree. However, it may make  iterations, which is one less than the worst case, if the search ends at the second-deepest level of the tree.

On average, assuming that each element is equally likely to be searched, binary search makes  iterations when the target element is in the array. This is approximately equal to  iterations. When the target element is not in the array, binary search makes  iterations on average, assuming that the range between and outside elements is equally likely to be searched.

In the best case, where the target value is the middle element of the array, its position is returned after one iteration.

In terms of iterations, no search algorithm that works only by comparing elements can exhibit better average and worst-case performance than binary search. The comparison tree representing binary search has the fewest levels possible as every level above the lowest level of the tree is filled completely. Otherwise, the search algorithm can eliminate few elements in an iteration, increasing the number of iterations required in the average and worst case. This is the case for other search algorithms based on comparisons, as while they may work faster on some target values, the average performance over all elements is worse than binary search. By dividing the array in half, binary search ensures that the size of both subarrays are as similar as possible.

Space complexity 
Binary search requires three pointers to elements, which may be array indices or pointers to memory locations, regardless of the size of the array.

Derivation of average case 
The average number of iterations performed by binary search depends on the probability of each element being searched. The average case is different for successful searches and unsuccessful searches. It will be assumed that each element is equally likely to be searched for successful searches. For unsuccessful searches, it will be assumed that the intervals between and outside elements are equally likely to be searched. The average case for unsuccessful searches is the number of iterations required to search an element within every interval exactly once, divided by the  intervals.

Successful searches 

In the binary tree representation, a successful search can be represented by a path from the root to the target node, called an internal path. The length of a path is the number of edges (connections between nodes) that the path passes through. The number of iterations performed by a search, given that the corresponding path has length , is  counting the initial iteration. The internal path length is the sum of the lengths of all unique internal paths. Since there is only one path from the root to any single node, each internal path represents a search for a specific element.

Since binary search is the optimal algorithm for searching with comparisons, this problem is reduced to calculating the minimum internal path length of all binary trees with  nodes, which is equal to:

For example, in a 7-element array, the root requires one iteration, the two elements below the root require two iterations, and the four elements below require three iterations. In this case, the internal path length is:

The average number of iterations would be  based on the equation for the average case. The sum for  can be simplified to:

Substituting the equation for  into the equation for :

For integer , this is equivalent to the equation for the average case on a successful search specified above.

Unsuccessful searches 
Unsuccessful searches can be represented by augmenting the tree with external nodes, which forms an extended binary tree. If an internal node, or a node present in the tree, has fewer than two child nodes, then additional child nodes, called external nodes, are added so that each internal node has two children. By doing so, an unsuccessful search can be represented as a path to an external node, whose parent is the single element that remains during the last iteration. An external path is a path from the root to an external node. The external path length is the sum of the lengths of all unique external paths. The external path length is divided by  instead of  because there are  external paths, representing the intervals between and outside the elements of the array.

This problem can similarly be reduced to determining the minimum external path length of all binary trees with  nodes. For all binary trees, the external path length is equal to the internal path length plus . Substituting the equation for :

Performance of alternative procedure 
Each iteration of the binary search procedure defined above makes one or two comparisons, checking if the middle element is equal to the target in each iteration. Assuming that each element is equally likely to be searched, each iteration makes 1.5 comparisons on average. A variation of the algorithm checks whether the middle element is equal to the target at the end of the search. On average, this eliminates half a comparison from each iteration. This slightly cuts the time taken per iteration on most computers. However, it guarantees that the search takes the maximum number of iterations, on average adding one iteration to the search. Because the comparison loop is performed only  times in the worst case, the slight increase in efficiency per iteration does not compensate for the extra iteration for all but very large .

Running time and cache use 
In analyzing the performance of binary search, another consideration is the time required to compare two elements. For integers and strings, the time required increases linearly as the encoding length (usually the number of bits) of the elements increase. For example, comparing a pair of 64-bit unsigned integers would require comparing up to double the bits as comparing a pair of 32-bit unsigned integers. The worst case is achieved when the integers are equal. This can be significant when the encoding lengths of the elements are large, such as with large integer types or long strings, which makes comparing elements expensive. Furthermore, comparing floating-point values (the most common digital representation of real numbers) is often more expensive than comparing integers or short strings.

On most computer architectures, the processor has a hardware cache separate from RAM. Since they are located within the processor itself, caches are much faster to access but usually store much less data than RAM. Therefore, most processors store memory locations that have been accessed recently, along with memory locations close to it. For example, when an array element is accessed, the element itself may be stored along with the elements that are stored close to it in RAM, making it faster to sequentially access array elements that are close in index to each other (locality of reference). On a sorted array, binary search can jump to distant memory locations if the array is large, unlike algorithms (such as linear search and linear probing in hash tables) which access elements in sequence. This adds slightly to the running time of binary search for large arrays on most systems.

Binary search versus other schemes 
Sorted arrays with binary search are a very inefficient solution when insertion and deletion operations are interleaved with retrieval, taking  time for each such operation. In addition, sorted arrays can complicate memory use especially when elements are often inserted into the array. There are other data structures that support much more efficient insertion and deletion. Binary search can be used to perform exact matching and set membership (determining whether a target value is in a collection of values). There are data structures that support faster exact matching and set membership. However, unlike many other searching schemes, binary search can be used for efficient approximate matching, usually performing such matches in  time regardless of the type or structure of the values themselves. In addition, there are some operations, like finding the smallest and largest element, that can be performed efficiently on a sorted array.

Linear search 
Linear search is a simple search algorithm that checks every record until it finds the target value. Linear search can be done on a linked list, which allows for faster insertion and deletion than an array. Binary search is faster than linear search for sorted arrays except if the array is short, although the array needs to be sorted beforehand. All sorting algorithms based on comparing elements, such as quicksort and merge sort, require at least  comparisons in the worst case. Unlike linear search, binary search can be used for efficient approximate matching. There are operations such as finding the smallest and largest element that can be done efficiently on a sorted array but not on an unsorted array.

Trees 

A binary search tree is a binary tree data structure that works based on the principle of binary search. The records of the tree are arranged in sorted order, and each record in the tree can be searched using an algorithm similar to binary search, taking on average logarithmic time. Insertion and deletion also require on average logarithmic time in binary search trees. This can be faster than the linear time insertion and deletion of sorted arrays, and binary trees retain the ability to perform all the operations possible on a sorted array, including range and approximate queries.

However, binary search is usually more efficient for searching as binary search trees will most likely be imperfectly balanced, resulting in slightly worse performance than binary search. This even applies to balanced binary search trees, binary search trees that balance their own nodes, because they rarely produce the tree with the fewest possible levels. Except for balanced binary search trees, the tree may be severely imbalanced with few internal nodes with two children, resulting in the average and worst-case search time approaching  comparisons. Binary search trees take more space than sorted arrays.

Binary search trees lend themselves to fast searching in external memory stored in hard disks, as binary search trees can be efficiently structured in filesystems. The B-tree generalizes this method of tree organization. B-trees are frequently used to organize long-term storage such as databases and filesystems.

Hashing 
For implementing associative arrays, hash tables, a data structure that maps keys to records using a hash function, are generally faster than binary search on a sorted array of records. Most hash table implementations require only amortized constant time on average. However, hashing is not useful for approximate matches, such as computing the next-smallest, next-largest, and nearest key, as the only information given on a failed search is that the target is not present in any record. Binary search is ideal for such matches, performing them in logarithmic time. Binary search also supports approximate matches. Some operations, like finding the smallest and largest element, can be done efficiently on sorted arrays but not on hash tables.

Set membership algorithms 
A related problem to search is set membership. Any algorithm that does lookup, like binary search, can also be used for set membership. There are other algorithms that are more specifically suited for set membership. A bit array is the simplest, useful when the range of keys is limited. It compactly stores a collection of bits, with each bit representing a single key within the range of keys. Bit arrays are very fast, requiring only  time.  The Judy1 type of Judy array handles 64-bit keys efficiently.

For approximate results, Bloom filters, another probabilistic data structure based on hashing, store a set of keys by encoding the keys using a bit array and multiple hash functions. Bloom filters are much more space-efficient than bit arrays in most cases and not much slower: with  hash functions, membership queries require only  time. However, Bloom filters suffer from false positives.

Other data structures 
There exist data structures that may improve on binary search in some cases for both searching and other operations available for sorted arrays. For example, searches, approximate matches, and the operations available to sorted arrays can be performed more efficiently than binary search on specialized data structures such as van Emde Boas trees, fusion trees, tries, and bit arrays. These specialized data structures are usually only faster because they take advantage of the properties of keys with a certain attribute (usually keys that are small integers), and thus will be time or space consuming for keys that lack that attribute. As long as the keys can be ordered, these operations can always be done at least efficiently on a sorted array regardless of the keys. Some structures, such as Judy arrays, use a combination of approaches to mitigate this while retaining efficiency and the ability to perform approximate matching.

Variations

Uniform binary search 

Uniform binary search stores, instead of the lower and upper bounds, the difference in the index of the middle element from the current iteration to the next iteration. A lookup table containing the differences is computed beforehand. To reduce the search space, the algorithm either adds or subtracts this change from the index of the middle element. Uniform binary search may be faster on systems where it is inefficient to calculate the midpoint, such as on decimal computers.

Exponential search 

Exponential search extends binary search to unbounded lists. It starts by finding the first element with an index that is both a power of two and greater than the target value. Afterwards, it sets that index as the upper bound, and switches to binary search. A search takes  iterations before binary search is started and at most  iterations of the binary search, where  is the position of the target value. Exponential search works on bounded lists, but becomes an improvement over binary search only if the target value lies near the beginning of the array.

Interpolation search 

Instead of calculating the midpoint, interpolation search estimates the position of the target value, taking into account the lowest and highest elements in the array as well as length of the array. It works on the basis that the midpoint is not the best guess in many cases. For example, if the target value is close to the highest element in the array, it is likely to be located near the end of the array.

A common interpolation function is linear interpolation. When linear interpolation is used, and the distribution of the array elements is uniform or near uniform, interpolation search makes  comparisons.

In practice, interpolation search is slower than binary search for small arrays, as interpolation search requires extra computation. Its time complexity grows more slowly than binary search, but this only compensates for the extra computation for large arrays.

Fractional cascading 

Fractional cascading is a technique that speeds up binary searches for the same element in multiple sorted arrays. Searching each array separately requires  time, where  is the number of arrays.

Fractional cascading was originally developed to efficiently solve various computational geometry problems. Fractional cascading has been applied elsewhere, such as in data mining and Internet Protocol routing.

Generalization to graphs 
Binary search has been generalized to work on certain types of graphs, where the target value is stored in a vertex instead of an array element. Binary search trees are one such generalization—when a vertex (node) in the tree is queried, the algorithm either learns that the vertex is the target, or otherwise which subtree the target would be located in. However, this can be further generalized as follows: given an undirected, positively weighted graph and a target vertex, the algorithm learns upon querying a vertex that it is equal to the target, or it is given an incident edge that is on the shortest path from the queried vertex to the target. The standard binary search algorithm is simply the case where the graph is a path. Similarly, binary search trees are the case where the edges to the left or right subtrees are given when the queried vertex is unequal to the target. For all undirected, positively weighted graphs, there is an algorithm that finds the target vertex in  queries in the worst case.

Noisy binary search 

Noisy binary search algorithms solve the case where the algorithm cannot reliably compare elements of the array. For each pair of elements, there is a certain probability that the algorithm makes the wrong comparison. Noisy binary search can find the correct position of the target with a given probability that controls the reliability of the yielded position. The noisy binary search problem can be considered as a case of the Rényi-Ulam game, a variant of Twenty Questions where the answers may be wrong.

Quantum binary search 
Classical computers are bounded to the worst case of exactly  iterations when performing binary search. Quantum algorithms for binary search are still bounded to a proportion of  queries (representing iterations of the classical procedure), but the constant factor is less than one, providing for a lower time complexity on quantum computers. Any exact quantum binary search procedure—that is, a procedure that always yields the correct result—requires at least  queries in the worst case, where  is the natural logarithm. There is an exact quantum binary search procedure that runs in  queries in the worst case. In comparison, Grover's algorithm is the optimal quantum algorithm for searching an unordered list of elements, and it requires  queries.

History 
The idea of sorting a list of items to allow for faster searching dates back to antiquity. The tablet contained about 500 sexagesimal numbers and their reciprocals sorted in lexicographical order, which made searching for a specific entry easier. In addition, several lists of names that were sorted by their first letter were discovered on the Aegean Islands. Catholicon, a Latin dictionary finished in 1286 CE, was the first work to describe rules for sorting words into alphabetical order, as opposed to just the first few letters.

In 1946, John Mauchly made the first mention of binary search as part of the Moore School Lectures, a seminal and foundational college course in computing. In 1957, William Wesley Peterson published the first method for interpolation search. Every published binary search algorithm worked only for arrays whose length is one less than a power of two until 1960, when Derrick Henry Lehmer published a binary search algorithm that worked on all arrays. In 1962, Hermann Bottenbruch presented an ALGOL 60 implementation of binary search that placed the comparison for equality at the end, increasing the average number of iterations by one, but reducing to one the number of comparisons per iteration. The uniform binary search was developed by A. K. Chandra of Stanford University in 1971. In 1986, Bernard Chazelle and Leonidas J. Guibas introduced fractional cascading as a method to solve numerous search problems in computational geometry.

Implementation issues 

When Jon Bentley assigned binary search as a problem in a course for professional programmers, he found that ninety percent failed to provide a correct solution after several hours of working on it, mainly because the incorrect implementations failed to run or returned a wrong answer in rare edge cases. A study published in 1988 shows that accurate code for it is only found in five out of twenty textbooks. Furthermore, Bentley's own implementation of binary search, published in his 1986 book Programming Pearls, contained an overflow error that remained undetected for over twenty years.  The Java programming language library implementation of binary search had the same overflow bug for more than nine years.

In a practical implementation, the variables used to represent the indices will often be of fixed size (integers), and this can result in an arithmetic overflow for very large arrays.

An infinite loop may occur if the exit conditions for the loop are not defined correctly. Once  exceeds , the search has failed and must convey the failure of the search. In addition, the loop must be exited when the target element is found, or in the case of an implementation where this check is moved to the end, checks for whether the search was successful or failed at the end must be in place. Bentley found that most of the programmers who incorrectly implemented binary search made an error in defining the exit conditions.

Library support 
Many languages' standard libraries include binary search routines:

 C provides the function bsearch() in its standard library, which is typically implemented via binary search, although the official standard does not require it so.
 C++'s Standard Template Library provides the functions binary_search(), lower_bound(), upper_bound() and equal_range().
 D's standard library Phobos, in std.range module provides a type SortedRange (returned by sort() and assumeSorted() functions) with methods contains(), equaleRange(), lowerBound() and trisect(), that use binary search techniques by default for ranges that offer random access.
 COBOL provides the SEARCH ALL verb for performing binary searches on COBOL ordered tables.
 Go's sort standard library package contains the functions Search, SearchInts, SearchFloat64s, and SearchStrings, which implement general binary search, as well as specific implementations for searching slices of integers, floating-point numbers, and strings, respectively.
 Microsoft's .NET Framework 2.0 offers static generic versions of the binary search algorithm in its collection base classes. An example would be System.Array's method BinarySearch<T>(T[] array, T value).
 For Objective-C, the Cocoa framework provides the NSArray -indexOfObject:inSortedRange:options:usingComparator: method in Mac OS X 10.6+. Apple's Core Foundation C framework also contains a CFArrayBSearchValues() function.
 Python provides the bisect module that keeps a list in sorted order without having to sort the list after each insertion.
 Ruby's Array class includes a bsearch method with built-in approximate matching.

See also 
  – the same idea used to solve equations in the real numbers

Notes and references

Notes

Citations

Sources

External links

 NIST Dictionary of Algorithms and Data Structures: binary search
 Comparisons and benchmarks of a variety of binary search implementations in C

Articles with example pseudocode
Search algorithms
2 (number)